Urandangi (formerly also spelled Urandangie) is an outback town in the locality of Piturie in the Shire of Boulia, Queensland, Australia.

Geography 

Urandangi is in the Channel Country. All watercourses in this area are part of the Lake Eyre drainage basin, and most will dry up before their water reaches Lake Eyre.

The predominant land use is grazing on native vegetation.

The Marmanya Aboriginal community is located in Urandangi.

History 
Waluwarra (also known as Warluwarra, Walugara, and Walukara) is an Australian Aboriginal language of Western Queensland. Its traditional language region is the local government area of Shire of Boulia, including Walgra Station and Wolga, from Roxborough Downs north to Carandotta Station and Urandangi on the Georgina River, on Moonah Creek to Rochedale, south-east of Pituri Creek.

An unnamed township was established 2 August 1883. On 12 December 1884, it was officially named Urandangi. The name is believed to be derived Aboriginal words, uranda-ngie, meaning much gidyea.

The township was a centre for travellers and drovers where a stock route crossed the Georgina River.  By 1920 Urandangi had a pub, two stores, post office, police station and a dance hall.

Urandangie Provisional School opened circa 1898. On 1 January 1909 it became Urandangie State School. It closed circa 1910, but reopened on 30 January 1922. It closed circa 1933.

On 11 April 1994 Urandangi State School (slightly different spelling) opened.

Facilities 
Today, Urandangi's only major facility is the Urandangi Hotel (also known as the "Dangi Pub").

Education 
Urandangi State School is a government primary (Early Childhood-6) school for boys and girls on the Urandangi North Road. It had only 8 students enrolled in 2015. In 2018, the school had an enrolment of 8 students with 2 teachers and 2 non-teaching staff (1 full-time equivalent).

There are no secondary schools in Urandangi. The nearest secondary school is in Mount Isa but too far for a daily commute. The Spinifex State College in Mount Isa offers boarding facilities. Other boarding schools or distance education would be options.

References

External links
Urandangi as seen in 2001 National Library of Australia
 
 How a determined pub owner transformed Urandangi into a peaceful patch of country Queensland https://amp.abc.net.au/article/100757266

Towns in Queensland
Populated places established in 1885
Shire of Boulia